One (Hellbound) is the debut release from Indianapolis thrash band Demiricous. It was released through Metal Blade Records in 2006. The band's debut garnered them a loyal following in the metal scene.

Track listing
"Repentagram" – 3:42
"Withdrawal Divine" – 3:58
"Vagrant Idol" – 3:36
"Beyond Obscene" – 3:36
"Perfection and the Infection" – 3:37
"Heathen Up (Out for Blood)" – 2:30
"Cheat the Leader" – 3:24
"Matador" – 3:24
"To Serve Is To Destroy" – 3:25
"Ironsides" – 2:35
"I Am Weapon" – 2:49
"Hellraisers" – 3:30

2006 albums
Demiricous albums